The 1966 FIFA World Cup qualification was a series of tournaments organised by the five FIFA confederations. The 1966 FIFA World Cup featured 16 teams with one place reserved for the host nation, England, and one reserved for defending champions Brazil. The remaining 14 places were determined by a qualification process in which the other 72 entered teams, from the five FIFA confederations, competed. UEFA, CONCACAF and CONMEBOL qualification was determined within the confederations, whilst AFC and CAF teams (alongside Australia) competed for one place at the tournament.

Of these 72 teams, 51 competed, while Guatemala, Congo-Brazzaville and the Philippines had their entries rejected.

In the Africa/Asia/Oceania zone:
 South Africa were disqualified after being suspended by FIFA due to apartheid.
 All 15 African nations later withdrew in protest after FIFA, citing competitive and logistical issues, confirmed there would be no direct qualification for an African team, with Syria (who were grouped in Europe) withdrawing in support of the African teams.
 South Korea were later forced to withdraw due to logistical issues after the Asia/Oceania tournament was moved from Japan to Cambodia.

The first qualification match, between Netherlands and Albania, was played on 24 May 1964 and the first goal in qualification was a penalty, scored by Dutch defender Daan Schrijvers. Qualification ended on 29 December 1965, when Bulgaria eliminated Belgium in a group tiebreaker to become the final qualifier for the World Cup.

There were 393 goals scored over 127 games, for an average of 3.09 goals per game and 51 teams played in qualification.

Qualified teams

Qualification process

The 16 spots available in the 1966 World Cup were distributed among the continental zones as follows:
 Europe (UEFA): 10 places, 1 of them went to automatic qualifier England, while the other 9 places were contested by 32 teams (including Israel and Syria).
 South America (CONMEBOL): 4 places, 1 of them went to automatic qualifier Brazil, while the other 3 places were contested by 9 teams.
 North, Central America and Caribbean (CONCACAF): 1 place, contested by 10 teams.
 Africa and Asia (CAF/AFC): 1 place, contested by 19 teams (including Australia from Oceania).
UEFA, CONMEBOL and CONCACAF had a guaranteed number of places, whereas the CAF and AFC had to contest a play-off to determine which confederation would be represented.

After the first round of 1966 FIFA World Cup finals, the percentage of teams from each confederation that passed through to the Quarter-finals was as follows:
 AFC (Asia): 100% (1 of 1 places)
 CAF (Africa): n/a (0 of 0 places)
 CONCACAF (North, Central American and Caribbean): 0% (0 of 1 places)
 CONMEBOL (South America): 50% (2 of 4 places)
 Oceania (No confederation): n/a (0 of 0 places)
 UEFA (Europe): 50% (5 of 10 places)

Summary of qualification

Tiebreakers
For FIFA World Cup qualifying stages using a league format, the method used for separating teams level on points was the same for all Confederations. If teams were even on points at the end of group play, the tied teams played a play-off at a neutral ground.

Confederation qualification

AFC, CAF and Oceania

21 teams – Australia, three teams from AFC and 17 teams from CAF – applied to take part in qualification, but the entries of Congo-Brazzaville and the Philippines were rejected.

South Africa, who had been expelled from CAF in 1958 due to the country's apartheid policies, were placed with the Asian and Oceanian teams. Also, Australia were not a member of a confederation at the time (the OFC was not founded until 1966).

The qualification process began with four national teams split between two sections for qualification: Israel and Syria competed in European qualification for geographical reasons, whilst North Korea and South Korea were to take part in a group alongside Australia and South Africa. The winner of this group would then go on to play the three group winners from the second round of CAF qualifiers.

However, South Africa was disqualified after being suspended by FIFA, and all 15 members of CAF withdrew in protest after FIFA declined to allocate them a direct qualifying place. Less than three weeks before the tournament, South Korea were forced to withdraw due to logistical difficulties after the tournament was moved from Japan to Cambodia.

African boycott
Qualification for the 15 remaining African teams saw them sorted into six groups: three groups of two and three groups of three. 

The winners of these groups were then to play a two-legged tie in the following combinations: Group 1 winners v Group 5 winners, Group 2 winners v Group 4 winners and Group 3 winners v Group 6 winners, with the winners advancing to play in the final group with each other and the winner of the Asia/Oceania group.

However, these African nations were aggrieved that their second-round winners would be required to enter a final round against the winners of the Asia/Oceania group in order to qualify for the final tournament. These nations demanded that Africa be represented in the tournament, and also objected to the readmission of South Africa to FIFA.

Due to pressure from the African nations and CAF, South Africa was suspended again on 21 September 1964, and were subsequently disqualified. However, after FIFA declined to change the qualifying format or the allocation of places, citing competitive and logistical issues, all fifteen African teams immediately withdrew in protest: subsequently, CAF informed FIFA that they would refuse to participate in qualifying for 1970 unless at least one African team had an automatic place in the World Cup. 

In 1968, FIFA unanimously voted to grant an automatic place for CAF from the 1970 World Cup onwards.

CONCACAF

10 teams initially entered, but the entry of Guatemala was rejected.

The remaining nine teams were placed in to three groups of three, with the winner of each group proceeding to a final group. The winner of this group would go on to the final tournament.

CONMEBOL

As Brazil has already qualified as reigning champions, the remaining nine CONMEBOL teams were split in to three groups of 3, playing each other twice (home and away). The top team from each group qualified.

Final positions (group stage)

In Group B, Chile and Ecuador finished level on points, and a play-off on neutral ground was played to decide who would qualify. Chile won the match to win the group.

UEFA

England qualified automatically as hosts and a further 30 European teams took part in qualification. They were joined by Israel and Syria, although Syria then withdrew in support of the African teams. The teams were divided into 9 groups - four groups of 3 and five groups of 4. Syria's withdrawal meant that group 9 only contained two teams.

Final positions (group stage)

In Group 1, Belgium and Bulgaria finished level on points, and a play-off on neutral ground was played to decide who would qualify. Bulgaria won the match 2–1.

In Group 9, the Republic of Ireland and Spain finished level on points, and a play-off on neutral ground was played to decide who would qualify. Spain won the match 1–0.

Goalscorers
7 goals

 Eusébio

6 goals

 Mimis Papaioannou

5 goals

 Paul Van Himst
 Georgi Asparuhov
 Sandro Mazzola
 Isidoro Díaz
 Jobby Crossan
 Włodzimierz Lubański
 Anatoliy Banishevskiy
 Héctor Silva

4 goals

 Nikola Kotkov
 Errol Daniels
 Leonel Hernández
 František Knebort
 Ernesto Cisneros
 Pedro Virgilio Rocha
 Roy Vernon
 Milan Galić

3 goals

 Luis Artime
 Ermindo Onega
 Johnny Thio
 Alberto Fouilloux
 Leonel Sánchez
 Edgar Marín
 William Quirós
 Karol Jokl
 Enrique Raymondi
 Juhani Peltonen
 Nestor Combin
 Philippe Gondet
 Giorgos Sideris
 Paolo Barison
 Lascelles Dunkley
 Louis Pilot
 Pak Seung-Zin
 Pedro Pablo León
 Jerzy Sadek
 Valentin Kozmich Ivanov
 Slava Metreveli
 Chus Pereda
 Siegfried Haltman
 Köbi Kuhn
 Ivor Allchurch
 Rudolf Brunnenmeier

2 goals

 Raúl Bernao
 Les Scheinflug
 Carlos Campos Sánchez
 Rubén Marcos
 Eugenio Méndez
 Ignacio Prieto
 Antonio Rada
 Hermenegildo Segrera
 Ivan Mráz
 Ole Fritsen
 Ole Madsen
 Peter Ducke
 Jürgen Nöldner
 Alberto Pedro Spencer
 János Farkas
 Máté Fenyvesi
 Giacinto Facchetti
 Bruno Mora
 Gianni Rivera
 José Luis González Dávila
 Javier Fragoso
 Aarón Padilla Gutiérrez
 Salvador Reyes Monteón
 Hennie van Nee
 Virgilio Sille
 Han Bong-Zin
 Kim Seung-Il
 George Best
 Harald Berg
 Erik Johansen
 Luis Zavalla
 Ernest Pol
 Nicolae Georgescu
 Viorel Mateianu
 John Greig
 Denis Law
 Vladimir Barkaya
 Stanley Humbert Krenten
 Edmund Waterval
 Lars Granström
 Bo Larsson
 Agne Simonsson
 Torbjörn Jonsson
 René-Pierre Quentin
 Andy Aleong
 Fevzi Zemzem
 Ed Murphy
 Werner Krämer
 Wolfgang Overath
 Klaus-Dieter Sieloff
 Dragan Džajić

1 goal

 Mexhit Haxhiu
 Robert Jashari
 Erich Hof
 Armand Jurion
 Wilfried Puis
 Jacques Stockman
 Fortunato Castillo
 Ramón Quevedo
 Rolando Vargas
 Stoyan Kitov
 Ivan Petkov Kolev
 Fernando Jiménez
 Tarcisio Rodríguez Viquez
 Juan González Soto
 Nicolás Martínez
 Ángel Piedra
 Antonio dos Santos
 Alexander Horváth
 Dušan Kabát
 Andrej Kvašňák
 Mogens Berg
 Kaj Poulsen
 Tommy Troelsen
 Eberhard Vogel
 Romulo Gómez
 Washington Muñoz
 Martti Hyvärinen
 Semi Nuoranen
 Marcel Artelesa
 André Guy
 Angel Rambert
 Andreas Papaemmanouil
 José Ricardo Taylor
 Ferenc Bene
 Kálmán Mészöly
 Dezső Novák
 Gyula Rákosi
 Andy McEvoy
 Rahamim Talbi
 Giacomo Bulgarelli
 Ezio Pascutti
 Syd Bartlett
 Oscar Black
 Patrick Blair
 Art Welch
 Asher Welch
 Ernest Brenner
 Edy Dublin
 Ady Schmit
 José Luis Aussin
 Ignacio Jáuregui
 Ramiro Navarro
 Frans Geurtsen
 Theo Laseroms
 Bennie Muller
 Daan Schrijvers
 Im Seung-Hwi
 Pak Doo-Ik
 Willie Irvine
 Terry Neill
 Per Kristoffersen
 Olav Nilsen
 Arne Pedersen
 Finn Seemann
 Kai Sjøberg
 Ole Stavrum
 Celino Mora
 Vicente Rodríguez
 Juan Carlos Rojas
 Nemesio Mosquera
 Jesús Peláez Miranda
 Víctor Zegarra
 Roman Lentner
 Mário Coluna
 Jaime Graça
 Sorin Avram
 Alexandru Badea
 Dan Coe
 Carol Creiniceanu
 Ion Pârcălab
 Stevie Chalmers
 Dave Gibson
 Billy McNeill
 Davie Wilson
 Boris Kazakov
 Galimzyan Khusainov
 Mikheil Meskhi
 Yozhef Sabo
 Valery Voronin
 Carlos Lapetra
 José Ufarte
 Kenneth Kluivert
 Kurt Hamrin
 Ove Kindvall
 Anton Allemann
 Robert Hosp
 Alvin Corneal
 Jeff Gellineau
 Bobby Sookram
 Ayhan Elmastaşoğlu
 Nedim Doğan
 Helmut Bicek
 Walt Schmotolocha
 Danilo Menezes
 José Urruzmendi
 Freddy Elie
 Rafael Santana
 Humberto Francisco Scovino
 Argenis Tortolero
 Ron Davies
 Wyn Davies
 Mike England
 Ronnie Rees
 Alfred Heiß
 Uwe Seeler
 Heinz Strehl
 Horst Szymaniak
 Dražan Jerković
 Vladica Kovačević
 Džemaludin Mušović
 Velibor Vasović

1 own goal

 José Ramos Delgado (playing against Bolivia)
 Ivan Vutsov (playing against Belgium)
 Kostas Panayiotou (playing against West Germany)
 Stig Holmqvist (playing against Italy)
 Ricardo González (playing against Argentina)
 José Ángel Iribar (playing against Ireland)
 Graham Williams (playing against the Soviet Union)

References

External links
 RSSSF - 1966 World Cup Qualification

 
Qualification
FIFA World Cup qualification